Arif Ardabili was a medieval poet who is famous for being author of Farhadnameh.

Life
Not much information survives about him. He was born in city of Ardabil, in 1311. He was brought to the court of Shirvanshah Kavus and became a court poet. He completed his magnum opus Farhadnameh in 1369 (in Persian language). He was strongly influenced by Nizami Ganjavi. He was tutor of Shirvanshah Hushang.

References

Persian-language poets
1311 births